María Isabel Urrutia Ocoró (born 25 March 1965) is a former weightlifter, athlete and politician from Colombia. She won the first ever gold medal for Colombia at the Summer Olympic Games.

Athletic career

Background 
Initially she competed in shot put and discus throw, and participated in the 1988 Summer Olympics in these events.

Weightlifting
She switched to weightlifting in 1989, and won silver at the 1989 World Championships. She won gold at the 1990, silver 1991, gold 1994, silver 1995, bronze 1996, silver 1997, and bronze at the 1998 World Weightlifting Championships.

Urrutia won a gold medal in the women's 75 kg class in the 2000 Summer Olympics, her country's first Olympic gold medal.

Personal life
Urrutia retired after the 2000 Olympics and entered politics. She held a seat in the Chamber of Representatives of Colombia from 2002 to 2010 (twice elected: 2002 and 2006).

Achievements in track and field

References

External links

databaseolympics.com profile

1965 births
Living people
People from Valle del Cauca Department
Cabinet of Gustavo Petro
Colombian sportsperson-politicians
United People's Movement (Colombia) politicians
Members of the Chamber of Representatives of Colombia
Colombian female discus throwers
Colombian female shot putters
Colombian female weightlifters
Olympic athletes of Colombia
Olympic weightlifters of Colombia
Olympic gold medalists for Colombia
Olympic medalists in weightlifting
Athletes (track and field) at the 1988 Summer Olympics
Athletes (track and field) at the 1987 Pan American Games
Athletes (track and field) at the 1991 Pan American Games
Athletes (track and field) at the 1995 Pan American Games
Weightlifters at the 2000 Summer Olympics
Weightlifters at the 1999 Pan American Games
World Athletics Championships athletes for Colombia
Medalists at the 2000 Summer Olympics
Pan American Games medalists in weightlifting
Pan American Games silver medalists for Colombia
South American Games gold medalists for Colombia
South American Games medalists in athletics
Competitors at the 1982 Southern Cross Games
Competitors at the 1994 South American Games
World Weightlifting Championships medalists
Afro-Colombian women
Central American and Caribbean Games medalists in athletics
Medalists at the 1999 Pan American Games
21st-century Colombian politicians
21st-century Colombian women politicians